ALAN, The Assembly on Literature for Adolescents is a teachers organization in the United States, an independent assembly of the National Council of Teachers of English (NCTE). Founded in November 1973, ALAN is made up of teachers, authors, librarians, publishers, teacher-educators and their students, and others who are particularly interested in the area of young adult literature. ALAN, which is self-governing, holds its annual meetings during the NCTE annual convention in November and also publishes The ALAN Review.

Almost from its inception, ALAN has given the ALAN award to honor those who have made outstanding contributions to the field of adolescent literature. The recipient may be a publisher, author, librarian, scholar, editor, or servant to the organization. Each year, an honoree is chosen by the Executive Board and receives the ALAN Award at the annual ALAN breakfast, which is held early morning Saturday during the NCTE Convention. In addition, in 2000 ALAN created the Hipple Award in honor of longtime Executive Secretary Ted Hipple, whose service led to the creation of the award for dedicated service to the organization.

The ALAN Award 
Almost from its inception, ALAN has given the ALAN Award to honor those who have made outstanding contributions to the field of adolescent literature. The recipient may be a publisher, author, librarian, scholar, editor, or servant to the organization. Each year, an honoree is chosen by the Executive Board and receives the ALAN Award at the annual ALAN breakfast, which is held early morning Saturday during the NCTE Convention. A list of past honorees is listed below.

ALAN Award recipients

 2015 Lois Lowry, author
 2014 David Levithan, author
 2013 Judy Blume, author
 2012 George Nicholson, publisher/agent
 2011 Sharon Draper, author
 2010 Jack Gantos, author
 2009 Naomi Shihab Nye, author
 2008 Laurie Halse Anderson, author
 2007 Teri Lesesne, professor
 2006 Virginia Monseau, professor, and Marc Aronson, author/editor
 2005 Jerry Spinelli, author
 2004 Jacqueline Woodson, author
 2003 Norma Fox Mazer, author and Harry Mazer, author (co-winners)
 2002 Paul Zindel, author
 2001 Patty Campbell, author/critic
 2000 M. E. Kerr, author
 1999 Robert Lipsyte, author
 1998 S. E. Hinton, author
 1997 Mildred Taylor, author
 1996 Bill Morris, publisher
 1995 Robert C. Small, Jr., professor
 1994 Walter Dean Myers, author
 1993 Chris Crutcher, author
 1992 Don Gallo, professor
 1991 Gary Paulsen, author
 1990 Richard Peck, author
 1989 Cynthia Voigt, author
 1988 Ted Hipple, professor
 1987 Katherine Paterson, author, and Alleen Pace Nilsen
 1986 Madeleine L'Engle, author
 1985 Sue Ellen Bridgers, author
 1984 Louise Rosenblatt, critic
 1983 Ken Donelson, professor
 1982 Robert Cormier, author
 1981 Sheila Schwartz
 1980 Dwight Burton
 1979 Gerri LaRocque
 1978 Mary Sucher
 1977 Marguerite Archer
 1976 Margaret K. McElderry, publisher, and  M. Jerry Weiss, professor
 1975 Margaret Edwards, librarian
 1974 Stephen Judy and G. Robert Carlsen

The Ted Hipple Service Award 
The Ted Hipple Service Award is given each year to the individual who has contributed to the ALAN organization. It is named in honor of Ted Hipple, the first and long-time ALAN Executive Secretary, who died on November 25, 2004. Ted shaped ALAN through decades of unwavering service and support. He was a Professor of Education at the University of Tennessee, where he was a chair of the Department of Curriculum and Instruction. Previously, he was a Professor of Education at the University of Florida. He received his doctorate from the University of Illinois and was a high school English teacher at Homewood-Flossmoor High School.

Hipple Award recipients

 2014 Connie Zitlow
 2013 Rick Williams
 2012 Joan F. Kaywell, University of South Florida, ALAN Past President and Membership Secretary
 2011 Gary Salvner, Youngstown State University, ALAN Past President and Executive Secretary
 2010 Christopher E. Crowe, Brigham Young University, ALAN Past President
 2009 Wendy Lamb, Wendy Lamb Books, Random House
 2008 Jeanne McDermott, Farrar, Straus & Giroux
 2007 Patricia Kelly, ALAN Past President
 2006 Alleen Pace Nilsen, ALAN Past President
 2005 Bill Subick, National Council of Teachers of English
 2004 John Mason, Scholastic, Inc.
 2003 M. Jerry Weiss, ALAN Past President
 2002 Terry Borzumato, Random House Children's Books
 2001 Don Gallo, ALAN Past President
 2000 Ted Hipple, ALAN Executive Secretary and Past President

The Amelia Elizabeth Walden Award 

Beginning 2009 the Amelia Elizabeth Walden Award annually recognizes "a book that exemplifies literary excellence, widespread appeal, and a positive approach to life in young adult literature". The winner and honor books must be fiction published in the United States during one year prior to the call for nominations (perhaps previously published elsewhere).

ALAN Presidents 

2015 Jennifer Buehler
2014 Daria Plumb
2013 Walter Mayes
2012 Jeffrey S. Kaplan
2011 C. J. Bott
2010 Wendy Glenn
2009 James Blasingame
2008 Pamela Sissi Carroll
2007 David Macinnis Gill
2006 Kathryn Kelly
2005 Diane Tuccillo
2004 Patty Campbell
2003 Michael Cart
2002 Bill Mollineaux
2001 Christopher E. Crowe
2000 Teri Lesesne
1999 Connie Zitlow
1998 Joan Kaywell
1997 Lois Stover
1996 Gary Salvner
1995 Charlie Reed
1994 Diana Mitchell
1993 Virginia Monseau
1992 Betty Carter
1991 Kay Bushman
1990 Betty Poe
1989 Patricia Kelly
1988 Barbara Samuels
1987 C. Anne Webb
1986 Donald R. Gallo
1985 Hazel Davis
1984 Richard Abrahamson
1983 Mike Angelotti
1982 Robert C. Small, Jr.
1981 Al Muller
1980 Hugh Agee
1979 Kenneth Donelson
1978 Alleen Pace Nilsen
1977 Sheila Schwartz
1976 Ted Hipple
1975 Helen Painter
1974 M. Jerry Weiss
1973 Marguerite Archer

References

External links 
 
 The ALAN Review at Digital Library and Archives, Virginia Tech

Teacher associations based in the United States
ALAN Award
Organizations established in 1973